The prime minister of Ghana was the head of government of Ghana from 1957 to 1960 and again from 1969 to 1972.

History of the office
The country's first leader and prime minister was Kwame Nkrumah of the Convention People's Party (CPP). He held that post from the date of Ghana's independence – 6 March 1957 to 1 July 1960, when a new constitution came into effect that abolished the position. Nkrumah became President of the Republic, but was later overthrown in a 1966 military coup.

When Ghana returned to civilian rule in 1969, the parliamentary system was restored. The Progress Party (PP), led by Kofi Abrefa Busia, won parliamentary elections and he became Prime Minister on 1 October 1969. Busia's government was deposed in a military coup on 13 January 1972.

A presidential system was instituted in 1979 when civilian rule was re-established. The post of Prime Minister was never revived.

Prime Ministers of Ghana (1957–1972)
Political parties

See also
List of governors of the Gold Coast
Lists of office-holders
President of Ghana
Vice-President of Ghana

References

 
Government of Ghana